Parti du renouveau démocratique can refer to:

 Democratic Renewal Party (Benin)
 Party for Democratic Renewal